The United States House of Representatives elections in California, 1898 was an election for California's delegation to the United States House of Representatives, which occurred as part of the general election of the House of Representatives on November 8, 1898. Republicans took an open Democratic seat and defeated the two Populist incumbents.

Overview

Delegation Composition

Results

District 1

District 2

District 3

District 4

District 5

District 6

District 7

See also
56th United States Congress
Political party strength in California
Political party strength in U.S. states
United States House of Representatives elections, 1898

References
California Elections Page 
Office of the Clerk of the House of Representatives

External links
California Legislative District Maps (1911-Present) 
RAND California Election Returns: District Definitions 

1898
California
United States House of Representatives